The House of Marchak (Russian: МАРШАК) was founded by Joseph Abramovich Marchak, a young talented jeweler in 1878, in Kiev, then in Russia. Considered one of the great competitors of Fabergé at the beginning of the last century and sometimes called “The Cartier of Kiev”, the company employed 150 workers at the start of the Russian Revolution of 1917. The name 'Marchak' (Russian: МАРШАК; Hebrew: מרש"ק)) is an acronym from the Hebrew expression Morenu Rabbi Shmuel Kaidanover, after the Kabbalah rabbi Aaron Samuel Kaidanover.

History

Kiev, 1868

Joseph Abramovich Marchak (1854 - 1918), was born in a Ukrainian Jewish family, the first son of Abram Isakovich Marchak and Feni Lazarevna. The name 'Marchak' (Russian: МАРШАК; Hebrew: מרש"ק)) is an acronym from the Hebrew expression Morenu Rabbi Shmuel Kaidanover.

At the age of 14 years old, Marchak left his hometown and family to start an apprenticeship in a jewelry workshop. Ten years later, he launched his own business, in Podol, a poor Kiev neighborhood. The hundred rubles he received as a dowry from his young wife not being enough, he pawned his clothing and with the money earned, he handcrafted his first item—a gold chain.

Within a year, he moved out up-town and settled in a five-room flat at 4, Kreschatyk, Kiev's main street. Business was doing well and he gained notoriety. The production got more and more diversified and his young chain-maker days were quickly forgotten. Both in jewelry-making and goldsmithing, Joseph Marchak ceaselessly created and innovated.

Turning to the International
At the end of the nineteenth century, Russia was prosperous, and orders for fine jewelry were flowing in apace. In 1890, Joseph Marchak set out on a journey to France; in many ways, Russia had a great influence on France. For example, six years later, in 1896, Tsar Nicolas II would lay the first stone of the most elegant bridge of Paris, the Pont Alexandre III.

Joseph traveled a lot, and he took part in many exhibitions in Moscow and St. Petersburg. By 1893, Joseph's reputation had traveled across the Atlantic. He was awarded a medal at the World's Fair in Chicago held in 1893 and in Antwerp in 1894. Every time he came back from one of his trips, he developed and improved the techniques he had discovered abroad. Courageous and persevering, he rebuilt his workshops, which had been devastated by a fire in 1899. He made the most of this misfortune by enlarging and modernizing the premises, and employing innovating laborers who shared his zeal. Now, 150 people work in the Kiev workshops. (In 1885, Joseph Marchak had employed only 20 persons in his Kiev workshop.)

Within a little more than twenty years, Joseph Marchak had become the most important jeweler of the Russian Empire, and his brand was a household name. 1913 marked the 300th anniversary of the Romanov dynasty. To commemorate the anniversary, Tsar Nicolas II came to Kiev and was presented with official gifts especially made by Marchak. These were the glory days for the House of Marchak. It was not long before Joseph Marchak was called “The Cartier of Kiev”, the outright rival of the famed Fabergé. Meanwhile, Alexander Marchak, the youngest son of Joseph, born in 1890, was studying law and attending some classes at the École des Beaux Arts and Art Deco in Paris. He had a passion—photography. However, the outbreak of World War I compelled him to go back to Russia.

Moving to France

When he arrived in Kiev, Alexander was required to fulfill the mandatory service requirement in the Russian Army. He was sent to the Austrian front, where he performed airborne reconnaissance photography which later proved to be of significant importance to war techniques.
Joseph Marchak died prematurely from cancer at the age of 64. As a great number of Russians were leaving their country in haste to join Europe, the Marchak family also fled, concealing the last remnants of their jewelry creations under their clothes. Upon their arrival in Paris, they were greeted by Joachim, one of Joseph's five sons, who had already settled as a physician in a Paris hospital.

1920: The rebirth of the House of Marchak

In Paris
As soon as he arrived in Paris, Alexander Marchak opened a jewelry shop on Rue de la Paix, at number 4 right next to Place Vendôme and the Hotel Ritz Paris, where a large number of wealthy foreigners had flocked, ever since its opening in 1898.

War broke out again and Europe witnessed the decline of the whole business.

1950 : Towards a New Marchak Generation

The second revival

Right after the war, Alexander Marchak hired Alexander Diringer. He remained designer of the House of Marchak until the end of the 60's.

Within a year, Jacques Verger joined the company. Alexander Marchak concentrated on the opening of his store in Paris and the development of the brand in France, whereas Jacques Verger focused on designs for the American market. The Marchak spirit lived on thanks to the collaboration of Jacques Verger and his various creators. Alexander Marchak retired in 1957.

The American years

In 1961 Breakfast at Tiffany's was on the movie screens. Jacques Verger began to create luxurious, colorful jewelry for his American customers. His rings were worn high-up on the finger, paved with diamonds, emeralds, rubies finely garlanded with stones, emerald foliage, or red-currant rubies supporting a central red, green, or blue stone.

Clustered, undulating, multi-colored brooches cemented the success of the House of Marchak. The cachet came entirely from the charm of these “object-jewels” that clearly marked a break in the tradition of traditional French jewelry.

Revival 

In 2000, one of the only heirs of Alexander Marchak to bear the Marchak name decided to revive the name of his great-grandfather by creating a new collection.
The collection has traveled around the world, attracting crowds in Saint Petersburg, the United States, Japan and Australia. 
In 2010 The House of Marchak initiated an inauguration ceremony of their new headquarters office in Hotel Ukraina of Moscow where everyone can see the unique beauty of Marchak chefs-d'oeuvre.

Further reading 

Source A. Le Tellier, August 2006'Art Deco Jewelry by Sylvie Raulet, publisher Thames & Hudson.

Halligan's Illustrated World's Fair, October 1893 issue.

SurnameMarchak''' is a surname of Austrian origin.

 Mandy Marchak (born 1984), Canadian rugby union player
 Mykola Marchak (1904-1938), Ukrainian politician

References

External links 
 The Official Marchak website
 Sotheby's Archived Sales, October 2005
 Marchak Paris, insight on the book

Companies established in 1878
Russian jewellers